This is a list of the Australian moth species of the family Hepialidae. It also acts as an index to the species articles and forms part of the full List of moths of Australia.

Abantiades albofasciatus (Swinhoe, 1892)
Abantiades aphenges (Turner, 1904)
Abantiades aurilegulus Tindale, 1932
Abantiades barcas (Pfitzner, 1914)
Abantiades fulvomarginatus Tindale, 1932
Abantiades hyalinatus (Herrich-Schäffer, 1853)
Abantiades hydrographus (R. Felder, 1874)
Abantiades labyrinthicus (Donovan, 1805)
Abantiades latipennis Tindale, 1932
Abantiades leucochiton (Pfitzner, 1914)
Abantiades magnificus (T.P. Lucas, 1898)
Abantiades marcidus Tindale, 1932
Abantiades ocellatus Tindale, 1932
Abantiades sericatus Tindale, 1932
Aenetus astathes (Turner, 1915)
Aenetus blackburnii (Lower, 1892)
Aenetus dulcis (Swinhoe, 1892)
Aenetus eximia (Scott, 1869)
Aenetus lewinii (Walker, 1856)
Aenetus ligniveren (Lewin, 1805)
Aenetus mirabilis Rothschild, 1894
Aenetus montanus Tindale, 1953
Aenetus ombraloma (Lower, 1902)
Aenetus ramsayi (Scott, 1869)
Aenetus scotti (Scott, 1869)
Aenetus scripta (Scott, 1869)
Aenetus splendens (Scott, 1864)
Aenetus tegulatus (Pagenstecher, 1888)
Aenetus tephroptilus (Turner, 1915)
Bordaia furva Tindale, 1932
Bordaia karnka Tindale, 1941
Bordaia moesta Tindale, 1932
Bordaia paradoxa Tindale, 1932
Bordaia pica Tindale, 1932
Elhamma australasiae (Walker, 1856)
Fraus basicornis Nielsen & Kristensen, 1989
Fraus basidispina Nielsen & Kristensen, 1989
Fraus bilineata Walker, 1865
Fraus biloba Nielsen & Kristensen, 1989
Fraus crocea (T.P. Lucas, 1891)
Fraus distispina Nielsen & Kristensen, 1989
Fraus furcata Nielsen & Kristensen, 1989
Fraus fusca (T.P. Lucas, 1891)
Fraus griseomaculata Nielsen & Kristensen, 1989
Fraus latristria Nielsen & Kristensen, 1989
Fraus linogyna Nielsen & Kristensen, 1989
Fraus marginispina Nielsen & Kristensen, 1989
Fraus mediaspina Nielsen & Kristensen, 1989
Fraus megacornis Nielsen & Kristensen, 1989
Fraus minima Nielsen & Kristensen, 1989
Fraus nanus (Herrich-Schäffer, 1853)
Fraus orientalis Nielsen & Kristensen, 1989
Fraus pelagia (Turner, 1927)
Fraus pilosa Nielsen & Kristensen, 1989
Fraus polyspila (Meyrick, 1890)
Fraus pteromela (Lower, 1892)
Fraus quadrangula Nielsen & Kristensen, 1989
Fraus serrata Nielsen & Kristensen, 1989
Fraus simulans Walker, 1856
Fraus tedi Nielsen & Kristensen, 1989
Jeana delicatula Tindale, 1935
Jeana robiginosa Turner, 1939
Oncopera alboguttata Tindale, 1933
Oncopera alpina Tindale, 1933
Oncopera brachyphylla Turner, 1925
Oncopera brunneata Tindale, 1933
Oncopera epargyra Turner, 1925
Oncopera fasciculatus (Walker, 1869)
Oncopera intricata Walker, 1856
Oncopera intricoides Tindale, 1933
Oncopera mitocera Turner, 1911
Oncopera parva Tindale, 1933
Oncopera rufobrunnea Tindale, 1933
Oncopera tindalei Common, 1966
Oxycanus aedesima (Turner, 1929)
Oxycanus antipoda (Herrich-Schäffer, 1853)
Oxycanus armatus Tindale, 1955
Oxycanus aurifex Tindale, 1935
Oxycanus australis Walker, 1856
Oxycanus ballux Tindale, 1935
Oxycanus barnardi Tindale, 1935
Oxycanus beltista (Turner, 1926)
Oxycanus buluwandji Tindale, 1964
Oxycanus byrsa (Pfitzner, 1933)
Oxycanus carus Tindale, 1935
Oxycanus determinata (Walker, 1856)
Oxycanus dirempta (Walker, 1865)
Oxycanus gelidus Tindale, 1935
Oxycanus glauerti Tindale, 1955
Oxycanus goldfinchi Tindale, 1935
Oxycanus goodingi Tindale, 1935
Oxycanus hamatus Tindale, 1935
Oxycanus herdus Tindale, 1935
Oxycanus hildae Tindale, 1964
Oxycanus incanus Tindale, 1935
Oxycanus janeus Tindale, 1935
Oxycanus kochi Tindale, 1955
Oxycanus loesus Tindale, 1935
Oxycanus lyelli Tindale, 1935
Oxycanus maculosus (R. Felder, 1874)
Oxycanus naias Tindale, 1935
Oxycanus niphadias (Meyrick, 1890)
Oxycanus nuptialis Tindale, 1935
Oxycanus occidentalis Tindale, 1935
Oxycanus oreades E.D. Edwards & K. Green, 2011
Oxycanus oressigenes E.D. Edwards & K. Green, 2011
Oxycanus perditus Tindale, 1935
Oxycanus poeticus Tindale, 1935
Oxycanus promiscuus Tindale, 1935
Oxycanus rosaceus Tindale, 1935
Oxycanus rufescens Walker, 1856
Oxycanus silvanus Tindale, 1935
Oxycanus sirpus Tindale, 1935
Oxycanus spadix Tindale, 1935
Oxycanus sphragidias (Meyrick, 1890)
Oxycanus stellans Tindale, 1935
Oxycanus subvaria (Walker, 1856)
Oxycanus waterhousei Tindale, 1935
Trictena argyrosticha Turner, 1929
Trictena atripalpis (Walker, 1856)
Trictena barnardi Tindale, 1941
Zelotypia stacyi Scott, 1869

External links 
Hepialidae at Australian Faunal Directory

Australia
Hepialidae